Arthur M. Madison  (January 14, 1871 – January 27, 1933), was a Major League Baseball infielder. He played for the 1895 Philadelphia Phillies and 1899 Pittsburgh Pirates. He remained active in the minor leagues through to 1906.

External links

1871 births
1933 deaths
Major League Baseball second basemen
Major League Baseball shortstops
Baseball players from Massachusetts
Philadelphia Phillies players
Pittsburgh Pirates players
19th-century baseball players
Johnstown Buckskins players
Albany Senators players
Philadelphia Athletics (minor league) players
Lancaster Maroons players
Indianapolis Hoosiers (minor league) players
Syracuse Stars (minor league baseball) players
Toronto Royals players
Worcester Hustlers players
Montreal Royals players
Worcester Riddlers players
Rochester Bronchos players
Utica Pent-Ups players
Sportspeople from Berkshire County, Massachusetts
Clarksburg, Massachusetts